Theodoric I (11 March 1162 – 18 February 1221), called the Oppressed (Dietrich der Bedrängte), was the Margrave of Meissen from 1198 until his death. He was the second son of Otto II, Margrave of Meissen and Hedwig of Brandenburg.

Biography
Theodoric, called in German Dietrich, the younger son of Otto II, Margrave of Meissen, fell out with his brother, Albert the Proud, after his mother persuaded his father to change the succession so that Theodoric was given the Margraviate of Meissen and Albrecht (although the older son) the margraviate of Weissenfels. Albert took his father prisoner to try to make him return the succession to the way it had been. After Otto obtained his release by an order of the emperor Frederick I, he had only just renewed the war when he died in 1190. Albert then took back the Meissen margraviate from his brother. Theodoric attempted to regain the margraviate, supported by Landgraf Hermann I of Thuringia, his father-in-law. In 1195, however, Theodoric left on a pilgrimage to Palestine.

Albrecht's Death
After Albrecht's death in 1195, leaving no children, Meissen, with its rich mines, was seized by the emperor Henry VI as a vacant fief of the empire. Dietrich finally came into possession of his inheritance two years later on Henry's death.

At the time of the struggle between the two rival kings Philip of Swabia and Otto IV, Holy Roman Emperor, Phillip gave Dietrich the tenure of the march of Meißen again. After that time, Dietrich was on Phillip's side and remained true to the Staufer even after Phillip was murdered in 1208.

Dietrich became caught up in dangerous disagreements with the city of Leipzig and the Meißen nobility. After a fruitless siege of Leipzig, in 1217 he agreed to a settlement but then took over the city by trickery, had the city walls taken down and built three castles of his own within the city, full of his own men.

Death
Margrave Dietrich died on 18 February 1221, possibly poisoned by his doctor, instigated into doing so by the people of Leipzig and the dissatisfied nobility. He left behind a widow, Jutta of Thuringia, daughter of Hermann I, Landgrave of Thuringia. Some of his children had already died.

Marriages and issue 
Children from his marriage to Jutta of Thuringia, daughter of Hermann I, Landgrave of Thuringia:
 Hedwig (d. 1249) married Count Dietrich V of Cleves (1185–1260)
 Otto (d. before 1215)
 Sophia (d. 1280) married Count Henry of Henneberg-Schleusingen (d. 1262)
 Jutta married Mestwin II, Duke of Pomerania
 Henry the Illustrious (1218–1288) Margrave of Meissen

Children from extramarital liaisons:
 Konrad
 Dietrich II (not the same as Dietrich von Kittlitz)
 Heinrich

References

Sources

|-

1162 births
1221 deaths
Margraves of Meissen
Place of birth unknown
Place of death unknown
Christians of the Crusade of 1197